What's Your Reputation Worth? is a lost 1921 American silent drama film directed by Webster Campbell and starring Corinne Griffith, Percy Marmont, and Leslie Roycroft.

Cast
 Corinne Griffith as Cara Deene 
 Percy Marmont as Anthony Blake 
 Leslie Roycroft as Wallace Trant 
 George Howard as Kent Jerrold 
 Robert Gaillard as Mr. Pettus 
 Jane Jennings as Mrs. Pettus 
 Louise Prussing as Mrs. Blake

References

Bibliography
 Munden, Kenneth White. The American Film Institute Catalog of Motion Pictures Produced in the United States, Part 1. University of California Press, 1997.

External links

lantern slide(Wayback Machine)

1921 films
1921 drama films
Silent American drama films
Films directed by Webster Campbell
American silent feature films
1920s English-language films
Vitagraph Studios films
American black-and-white films
1920s American films